Hugh Washington "Muzz" Murray (October 1, 1891 in Sault Ste. Marie, Michigan – February 13, 1961) was an American professional ice hockey defenseman. Murray played professionally in the Pacific Coast Hockey Association and Western Canada Hockey League for the Seattle Metropolitans and Calgary Tigers. He was inducted into the United States Hockey Hall of Fame in 1987.

External links
 United States Hockey Hall of Fame bio
 Muzz Murray at JustSportsStats
 

1891 births
1961 deaths
American men's ice hockey forwards
Calgary Tigers players
Ice hockey players from Michigan
People from Sault Ste. Marie, Michigan
Seattle Metropolitans players
United States Hockey Hall of Fame inductees